Krems may refer to:

Krems an der Donau, a city in Lower Austria
Krems, Carinthia, a small municipality in the district of Spittal an der Drau in Carinthia in Austria
Two rivers in Austria:
Krems (Lower Austria)
Krems (Upper Austria)
Krems II, a municipality in the district of Segeberg in Schleswig-Holstein, Germany

See also
Kremsmünster
Kremser SC, association football club based in Krems an der Donau